Bikstok Røgsystem is a Danish dancehall band consisting of Eaggerman (Dwayne McFarlane), Pharfar (Søren Schou) and Blæs Bukki (Lasse Bavngaard). The band is one of the first to perform reggae and dancehall in Danish.

Their debut and only album Over stok og sten was very successful, received very favourable reviews, and entered the Danish album chart as number one in February and made Gold by June 2005.

From 2006 until 2012, the group have been more or less disbanded, but it still occasionally reunited for one-off performances.

From 2013 they got together in a reunion to prepare a new album. The result was the 2015 album Uranium with the album being credited to Bikstok rather than the full name Bikstok Røgsystem.

Discography

Albums

Singles

References

External links
 Official website
 Profile at dancehall.dk
 MySpace profile

Dancehall musicians
Danish musical groups